Leslie Herbert Kane (1 January 1945 – 19 October 1978) was an Australian gangster who lived in Melbourne, Australia. He became a member of the Federated Union of Painters and Dockers at the age of fourteen. By the time of Kane's death, he had appeared in court 27 times as the accused.

Life
Kane was one of three brothers who also were in the same line of business , but Les was considered the most violent and unpredictable of the three . His brothers were Brian Kane and Raymond Kane. All eventually killed others: Les killed a fellow Painter and Docker, Brian famously killed Ray Bennett and Ray killed his estranged girlfriend.

Kane left school and became a member of the Federated Union of Painters and Dockers at the age of fourteen.

He was married twice. Through Trish, his first wife, he had a son and two daughters, Suzanne and Trish. Trish later married Jason Moran, a member of the criminal Moran family, who was shot dead during the Melbourne's gangland war in June 2003. In 2009, Suzanne was arrested and charged with accessory after the fact of murder for her involvement, along with Judy Moran, of Suzanne Kane's partner, Geoffrey Amour; and one other male, with the death of Desmond "Tuppence" Moran in Ascot Vale in June 2009. Suzanne Kane was sentenced on 2 February 2011 to two years' jail, suspended for two years.

His second wife was Judy.

Murder
On the night of 19 October 1978, Kane, his wife Judy and the children returned home to their Wantirna unit after visiting family. Judy found three gunmen lying in wait in her bedroom armed with silenced 'machine guns'. Les Kane was in the bathroom when Judy was dragged to another room by one of the gunmen and the other two opened fire on Les. The body of Les Kane was loaded into the boot of his distinctive pink Ford Futura by a fourth man believed to be hitman Rodney "The Duke" Collins who was outside during the murder. Kane's body was never found.

It is believed that this murder took place to eliminate the Kane brothers after a fight between Brian Kane and Vincent Mikkleson in a Richmond pub, in which Brian was beaten and suffered the ignominy of having a chunk of an ear bitten off. Believing the Kane family would come after him, Mikkleson and his friends decided to strike first.

After the murders, Judy Kane observed the painters and dockers' code of silence and did not make contact with police. Rumours circulated among criminal and police circle alike, and the police eventually queried Judy about the whereabouts of Les Kane.

The three suspected gunmen were Raymond Patrick "Ray Chuck" Bennett, Mikkleson and Laurence Pendergast. They were charged, but were acquitted in September 1979, primarily because Kane's body was not found. One, Ray Bennett, was shot the following year inside a courthouse where he was to face an armed robbery charge, by a man police believe to have been Brian Kane. Brian Kane was himself murdered on 26 November 1982, believed to be in revenge for Bennett's death.

In popular culture
He was portrayed by Australian actor Martin Dingle-Wall in the television series Underbelly: A Tale of Two Cities in 2009.

References

Books
 John Silverster and Andrew Rule, Tough - 101 Australian Gangsters, Floridale Productions and Sly Ink, 2002 

1945 births
1979 deaths
Criminals from Melbourne
Australian people convicted of assault
People convicted of theft
Australian murder victims
Deaths by firearm in Victoria (Australia)